Secret admirer may refer to:

 Secret admirer, an individual who has feelings of affection towards another person without revealing their identity to the object of their affection
 Secret Admirer (film), 1985 film directed by David Greenwalt starring C. Thomas Howell and Lori Loughlin
 Secret Admirer (soundtrack) for the 1985 film directed by David Greenwalt
 "Secret Admirer" (Frasier), the sixth episode in season six of American situation comedy Frasier
 Secret Admirer (song), a song by American rapper Pitbull